Ivan Miljković  (born 13 September 1979) is a Serbian volleyball player, a member of Serbia men's national volleyball team in 1998–2012, Olympic Champion 2000, European Champion (2001, 2011), medalist of World Championship, World Grand Champions Cup, World Cup and World League.

After his active playing career Ivan reminded engaged in sport in different positions (governance, marketing, campaigns, management). After sport career resumed with education in economy and finance in order to get more insights about PE, VC and RE investments and M&A transactions.

Ivan has a strong interest in technologies such as blockchain, smart contracts, NFTs and Metaverse.

Career

Clubs
After this success he changed his club and started playing for Italian Lube Banca Macerata. In 2001 the Yugoslav team won the European Volleyball Championship in Ostrava, Czech Republic. With his club, Lube Banca Macerata, he also won the Champions League (2001), twice the Italian Cup (2001, 2003) and three times the CEV Cup (2001, 2005, 2006).

On 18 July 2007 he signed a contract with the M. Roma Volley. The following year, on 5 July 2008, Olympiacos, announced that he will be continuing his career in Greece. In 2009 he won the Greek Championship and the Greek Cup and in 2010 the championship. On 30 June 2010 he signed a two-year contract for Fenerbahçe SK of Turkey. With Fenerbahçe he won 2011 and 2012 Turkish volleyball league, 2012 Turkish Cup, 2011 and 2012 Turkish Super Cup and 2014 European Challenge Cup. Miljković played for Fenerbahçe Grundig in 2010–2015. Miljković in 2015 sing in Italian club Cucine Lube Civitanova. Miljković in 2016 back to Turkey League.

He ended up his career after achieving gold medal of Turkish Championship in May 2017 with Halkbank Ankara team.

National team
He played in the national team of FR Yugoslavia for the first time a year later (on 4 October 1998, in a game against Turkey). In 2000 in Sydney the Yugoslav national team (members of which were also Vladimir Grbić, Nikola Grbić, Andrija Gerić, Goran Vujević) won the Olympic gold medal. In the final match against Russia Ivan Miljković scored the last point and after that fell on his knees.
In March 2012, has officially retired from the Serbian National Team after 14 years and 288 played matches. The only player to win MVP of the FIVB World League 3 times in a row (2002, 2003, 2004) and only player to win 4 MVP awards during the FIVB World League (2002, 2003, 2004, 2006).

Sports business professional career
 Chief Athletes Commission – Olympic Committee of Serbia
 Executive Board Member – Olympic Committee of Serbia
 1st Vice President – Volleyball Federation of Serbia

Executive education
 Université de Limoges Master's degree, Sport Governance, 2020 - 2022
 Harvard Business School Online, Alternative Investments, Jan 2022 - Feb 2022, Private Equity, Private Debt, Distressed Investing and Secondaries, Hedge Funds, Real Estate, Portfolio Construction
 Faculty of Economics, Finance and Administration - FEFA, Business Administration, Management and Operations

Style of play
Miljković is regularly on the top of the best spikers list in the tournaments and has a great jump serve. He is very well built and extremely strong opposite hitter who has variety of different shots; he can swing the ball away with a power or using his good technique. For an extremely big player Miljković moves surprisingly well. He has a good footwork and is quick from his feet; therefore he is able to generate good speed for his approach from any distance to the ball.

Sporting achievements

Clubs

CEV Champions League
  2001/2002 – with Lube Macerata
  2015/2016 – with Cucine Lube Civitanova

CEV Challenge Cup
  2000/2001, 2004/2005, 2005/2006 – with Lube Macerata
  2013/2014 – with Fenerbahçe

CEV Cup
  2007–2008 – with M. Roma

National League
 Champions Italia – 2005–2006
 Champions Greece – 2008–2009, 2009–2010
 Champions Turkey – 2010–2011, 2011–2012, 2016–2017
 Champions Qatar  – 2009, 2010, 2012

Individually
 2001 World League "Most Valuable Player"
 2001 World League "Best Scorer"
 2001 European Championship "Most Valuable Player"
 2001 European Championship "Best Scorer"
 2001 World Grand Champions Cup "Most Valuable Player"
 2001 World Grand Champions Cup "Best Scorer"
 2002 Serie A1 League "Most Valuable Player"
 2002 World League "Most Valuable Player"
 2002 World League "Best Scorer"
 2003 World League "Most Valuable Player"
 2003 World League "Best Scorer"
 2005 World League "Most Valuable Player"
 2005 World League "Best Scorer"
 2005 World League "Best Server"
 2005 European Championship "Best Server"
 2005–06 Top Teams Cup "Most Valuable Player"
 2005–06 Top Teams Cup "Best Scorer"
 2005–06 Top Teams Cup "Best Blocker"
 2006 Serie A1 League "Most Valuable Player"
 2007 European Championship "Best Scorer"
 2007–08 CEV Cup "Best Spiker"
 2008 World League "Best Scorer"
 2009 World League "Best Scorer"
 2010 Greek Volley League "Most Valyable Player
 2009–10 CEV Champions League "Best Scorer"
 2011 European Championship "Most Valuable Player"
 2011 Sportsperson of the Year of Niš
 Best Volleyball Player in the History by volleyball-movies.net
 Serbia's sport Association "May Award"
 2013–2014 Challenge Cup "Most Valuable Player"

Record
 37 Points – 2002 FIVB World League record
 37 Points – 2005 FIVB World League record

References

1979 births
Living people
Sportspeople from Niš
Yugoslav men's volleyball players
Serbia and Montenegro men's volleyball players
Serbian men's volleyball players
Olympic volleyball players of Yugoslavia
Olympic volleyball players of Serbia and Montenegro
Olympic volleyball players of Serbia
Olympic gold medalists for Federal Republic of Yugoslavia
Volleyball players at the 2000 Summer Olympics
Volleyball players at the 2004 Summer Olympics
Volleyball players at the 2008 Summer Olympics
Olympiacos S.C. players
Fenerbahçe volleyballers
Olympic medalists in volleyball
European champions for Serbia
European champions for Serbia and Montenegro
Medalists at the 2000 Summer Olympics
Serbian expatriate sportspeople in Italy
Serbian expatriate sportspeople in Greece
Serbian expatriate sportspeople in Turkey
Opposite hitters